Bagratuni may refer to:

Princes of Armenia
Varaz-Tirots II Bagratuni (c. 590 – 645), presiding prince in 645
Smbat VI Bagratuni (c. 670 – 726), presiding prince from 691 to 711
Ashot III Bagratuni or Ashot the Blind (c. 690–762), presiding prince from 726 to 732 
Sahak VII Bagratuni, prince from 754 to 771

Kings of Armenia
Ashot I Bagratuni of Armenia, king from 884 to 890
Smbat I Bagratuni or "the Martyr" (850–912), king from 890 to 912 
Ashot II Bagratuni of Armenia or Ashot the Iron, king from 914 to 928
Abas I Bagratuni of Armenia, king from 928 to 953
Ashot III Bagratuni of Armenia, Ashot III the Merciful or Ashot the Gracious, king from 953 to 977

Other uses
 Kingdom of Armenia (Middle Ages), also known as Bagratid Armenia (861 to 1118 AD), ruled by the Bagratuni Dynasty
 Bagratuni dynasty, or Pakradouni dynasty in Western Armenian, a ruling family in Armenia

See also
Bagrationi dynasty
Origin of the Bagratid dynasties
Pakradouni (disambiguation)

hy:Բագրատունի